Francesco Braschi (born 27 November 2004), is an Italian racing driver competing in the 2022 Formula Regional European Championship for KIC Motorsport.

Career

Italian F4 Championship

2020 
After several tests, Braschi made his car racing debut in the 2020 Italian F4 Championship with Jenzer Motorsport from Round 4, alongside Santiago Ramos. He finished 35th in the standings.

2021 

Braschi continued with Jenzer Motorsport for his first full season in the 2021 Italian F4 Championship, where he finished 16th in the standings, with 27 points.

F4 UAE Championship

2021 
Braschi competed in the first and third round of the 2021 Formula 4 UAE Championship with BWT Mücke Motorsport.

ADAC Formula 4

2021 

Braschi competed in the first two rounds of the 2021 ADAC Formula 4 Championship with Jenzer Motorsport as a guest driver.

F4 Spanish Championship

2021 
Braschi competed in the first round of the 2021 F4 Spanish Championship with Jenzer Motorsport.

Formula Regional Asian Championship

2022 
Braschi competed in three rounds of the 2022 Formula Regional Asian Championship with 3Y by R-ace GP. With 3 points, he finished 22nd in the standings.

Formula Regional European Championship 
Braschi joined KIC Motorsport for the 2022 Formula Regional European Championship.

Eurocup-3 
For 2023, Braschi joined the Eurocup-3 with Campos Racing.

Racing record

Racing career summary 

† As Braschi was a guest driver, he was ineligible for championship points.
* Season still in progress.

Complete Italian F4 Championship results 
(key) (Races in bold indicate pole position) (Races in italics indicate fastest lap)

Complete Formula Regional European Championship results 
(key) (Races in bold indicate pole position) (Races in italics indicate fastest lap)

* Season still in progress.

Complete Formula Regional Middle East Championship results
(key) (Races in bold indicate pole position) (Races in italics indicate fastest lap)

* Season still in progress.

References

External links 
 

2004 births
Living people
Italian racing drivers
Italian F4 Championship drivers
ADAC Formula 4 drivers
Jenzer Motorsport drivers
Formula Regional Asian Championship drivers
Formula Regional European Championship drivers
Mücke Motorsport drivers
MP Motorsport drivers
KIC Motorsport drivers
FA Racing drivers
R-ace GP drivers
Spanish F4 Championship drivers
UAE F4 Championship drivers
Formula Regional Middle East Championship drivers
Campos Racing drivers